Ajaz Akhtar (born 1 September 1968) is a former Pakistani-born British first-class cricketer. Akhtar is a right-handed batsman who bowls right-arm medium pace. He was born in Bahawalpur, Pakistan. Upon coming to the United Kingdom, he was educated at Deacon's School, Teesside University, University of Hertfordshire and Durham University.

Akhtar made his debut for Cambridgeshire in the 1990 Minor Counties Championship against Staffordshire. From 1990 to 2011, he represented the county in 147 Minor Counties Championship matches. He also represented the county in 56 MCCA Knockout Trophy matches from 1991 to 2010.

Akhtar also represented Cambridgeshire in List A cricket, where he made his debut in that format of the game against Kent in the 1991 NatWest Trophy. From 1991 to 2004, he represented the county in sixteen List A matches, with his final List A appearance coming in the 2004 Cheltenham & Gloucester Trophy against Northamptonshire. In his sixteen List A matches, he scored 278 runs at a batting average of 23.16, with a single half century high score of 78. In the field he took 6 catches. With the ball, he took 23 wickets at a bowling average of 24.78, with best figures of 4/28.

He resigned as Cambridgeshire captain at the end of the 2010 season, before retiring midway through the 2011 season. He took over 500 wickets for Cambridgeshire.

References

External links
Ajaz Akhtar at ESPNcricinfo
Ajaz Akhtar at CricketArchive

1968 births
Living people
Cricketers from Bahawalpur
Pakistani emigrants to the United Kingdom
British Asian cricketers
British sportspeople of Pakistani descent
Alumni of the University of Hertfordshire
Alumni of Durham University
Alumni of Teesside University
People educated at Deacon's School
English cricketers
Cambridgeshire cricketers
Punjabi people